Inveresk Roman Fort is an archaeological site within the grounds of St Michael's Church, Inveresk, a village in East Lothian, Scotland.

Fort 
The fort covered an area of 6.6 acres (2.7 ha), placing it at the larger end of the spectrum of fort sizes. For this reason, the original excavator, Ian Richmond, believed that a cavalry regiment had been stationed here. In 2007 a Roman tombstone was found at nearby Carberry depicting a Roman Governor's guard cavalry trooper named "Crescens" who was perhaps residing at the fort when he died.

Occupation 
All of the datable artefacts point to Antonine occupation. Consequently, the fort is thought to have been established in the immediate aftermath of the invasion of Scotland launched by the emperor Antoninus Pius in AD 139/140. Two clear phases of occupation were identified archaeologically, perhaps occasioned by a change of garrison during the Antonine period. The fort will have been abandoned, along with the other Scottish sites, around AD 160, when Hadrian's Wall was recommissioned.

A substantial civil settlement (vicus) lay outside the east rampart of the fort, and included a curving structure thought to be an amphitheatre.

Archaeology 
Several seasons of excavation since 1946, both major and minor, have established the outline of the fort and recovered some of the interior detail.

Excavations in 2004 by Headland Archaeology as part of work to renew the water mains in the village, found Roman artefacts and possible a boundary ditch and evidence of the vicus.

In 2010, CFA Archaeology undertook excavations, as part of a planning condition in advance of the construction of the  Musselburgh Primary Health Care Centre, on an area 50m to the north and down slope of the fort. Those excavations reveled a Mesolithic stone tool scatter and Iron Age burials that pre-dated the fort. Those burials were date to 50 BC – AD 130, just before the fort was built. Isotope analysis showed that the individuals were all local to the Musselburgh area.

The archaeologists found Roman remains, including six Roman human burials (four of which had been decapitated) and one horse burial. They also found evidence that a Roman fortlet was constructed and that at some point a Roman field system was put in place to grow food, possibly for the fort. The area was also used as a midden for the fort and a significant number discarded personal belongings of the fort occupants were recovered. This included samian bowls with personal names scratched on the bases. These names plus the isotope analysis of the human skeletons, shows that the ethnic origin of those living in the fort was diverse. The names indicates there may have been a group of soldiers from Thrace at the fort. The high number of horse equipment recovered led the archaeologists to believe that the theory that a cavalry unit was stationed there at some point is likely true.

Name 
The fort's Roman name remains unknown, although it has been suggested that Ptolemy's Κούρια (Curia or Coria), located in the lands of the Votadini, should be identified with Inveresk, "the name being transferred from a native meeting-place which it controlled (in this case perhaps Arthur's Seat, 4 miles to the west)". It may also have been called "Evidensca" according to the Ravenna Cosmography.

References

Sources
M.C. Bishop (ed.), Roman Inveresk: Past, Present and Future (Duns: The Armatura Press, 2002)

Archaeological sites in East Lothian
Musselburgh
Scheduled monuments in Scotland
Roman auxiliary forts in Scotland